Pia Laus-Schneider (born 2 May 1968) is an Italian equestrian, born in Frankfurt am Main. She competed in individual dressage and team dressage at the 1992 Summer Olympics in Barcelona. She also competed at the 1996 Summer Olympics and the 2000 Summer Olympics.

References

External links

1968 births
Living people
Sportspeople from Frankfurt
Italian female equestrians
Italian dressage riders
Olympic equestrians of Italy
Equestrians at the 1992 Summer Olympics
Equestrians at the 1996 Summer Olympics
Equestrians at the 2000 Summer Olympics